KYSE (94.7 MHz) is a commercial FM radio station in El Paso, Texas.   It airs the "La Tricolor" Regional Mexican radio format from its owner, Entravision Communications. (Tricolor refers to the three colors on the flag of Mexico.)  The studio and offices are located on North Mesa Street (Texas State Highway 20) in northwest El Paso.

KYSE's transmitter is located in the Franklin Mountains, off Scenic Drive in El Paso.  It has an effective radiated power (ERP) of 97,000 watts horizontal polarization, 65,000 watts vertical polarization.  With beam tilt, the ERP is 100,000 horizontal, 67,000 vertical.  The signal can be heard in parts of Texas, New Mexico and the Mexican state of Chihuahua including Ciudad Juárez.

History

KHMS and KSET-FM
The H-M Service Company, owned by Albert C. Hynes and Logan D. Matthews, obtained a Federal Communications Commission (FCC) construction permit for 94.7 MHz in 1958.  Later that year, it signed on KHMS, on November 29, 1958.  The call sign represented the company's initials.  In its early years, the signal was powered at 2,500 watts, only audible in El Paso and adjacent communities.

In 1962, the station was sold to the Rio Grande Broadcasting Company, owners of AM 1340 KSET (now KVIV), and became KSET-FM.  Aside from a brief period as KPAK in the mid-1960s, the station retained these call letters for the next 24 years.  KSET-FM increased its effective radiated power to 100,000 watts in 1970.

In the mid- to late 1970s and early 1980s, KSET-FM aired a Top 40 format which leaned toward rhythmic and dance music.  For a time, the station was called Disco-95 during the disco music craze.  It sometimes was simulcast on AM 1340 KSET.

Changes in Ownership
In the 1970s, KSET-AM-FM was transferred four times, from Rio Grande Broadcasting Company to Financial Computer Services, Automated Data Processing of El Paso, Sun World Corporation, and then Broadcast Associates of Texas. The Dunn Broadcasting Company bought KSET-AM-FM in 1982, selling off the AM two years later.  In 1986, the Rio Bravo Broadcasting Company changed KSET's format to soft adult contemporary.  The call sign was switched to KLTO to accompany the name "K-Lite."

Five years later, this format was replaced with a simulcast of AM 750 KAMA's Spanish-language Regional Mexican format, creating the first KAMA-FM.

Country, Alternative and Regional Mexican
The simulcast was short-lived and the station returned to the KSET-FM call letters in 1992, adopting a country music format, putting it in competition with El Paso's longtime country music leader 96.3 KHEY-FM.  KSET-FM became KATH in 1998.  But it didn't make much of a dent in KHEY-FM's ratings.  It was sold to Entravision in 1999.

Entravision switched it to alternative rock as KHRO "Hero 94.7" in 2000.  Then in 2005, the station returned to a Regional Mexican format as El Gato 94.7 Salvajemente Grupera. The KHRO callsign has been changed to KYSE In 2014 the station switched to La Tricolor while still retaining the KYSE call letters.

References

External links
 

YSE
Entravision Communications stations